This is a list of Knights Companion of the Order of the Star of India. The Letters Patent of 23 February 1861 founding the Order were gazetted on 25 June 1861, and established that the Order would consist of the Sovereign (the Queen of the United Kingdom), the Grand Master (the Viceroy of India, ex officio) and 25 Knights, who bore the postnominal KSI.

Letters Patent of 28 March 1866, gazetted on 25 May 1866, expanded the Order to include the Sovereign, the Grand Master, 25 Knights Grand Commanders, 50 Knights Commanders, and 100 Companions. There were later further extensions to the membership. At the time of the expansion of the Order in 1866, the surviving Knights Companions became Knights Grand Commanders (GCSI).

See also
 List of Knights Commander of the Order of the Star of India
 List of Knights Grand Commander of the Order of the Star of India

References

Sources

Order of the Star of India

Star of India